Point Pleasant is an unincorporated community in New Madrid County, Missouri, United States.

History
The first settlement at Point Pleasant was made in 1815. The town site was platted in 1846, and so named on account of its scenic location. A post office called Point Pleasant was established in 1845, and remained in operation until 1979.

At the turn of the 20th century, Point Pleasant contained a cotton gin and a saw mill.

References

Unincorporated communities in New Madrid County, Missouri
Unincorporated communities in Missouri